Sir Sultan Mahomed Shah, Aga Khan III  (2 November 187711 July 1957) was the 48th Imam of the Nizari Ismaili sect of Islam. He was one of the founders and the first permanent president of the All-India Muslim League (AIML). His goal was the advancement of Muslim agendas and protection of Muslim rights in British India. The League, until the late 1930s, was not a large organisation but represented the landed and commercial Muslim interests as well as advocating for British education during the British Raj. There were similarities in the Aga Khan's views on education with those of other Muslim social reformers, but the scholar Shenila Khoja-Moolji argues that he also expressed distinct interest in advancing women's education for women themselves. Aga Khan called on the British Raj to consider Muslims to be a separate nation within India, the famous 'Two Nation Theory'. Even after he resigned as president of the AIML in 1912, he still exerted a major influence on its policies and agendas. He was nominated to represent India to the League of Nations in 1932 and served as President of the League of Nations from 1937 to 1938.

Early life
He was born in Karachi, Sindh during the British Raj in 1877 (now Pakistan), to Aga Khan II and his third wife, Nawab A'lia Shamsul-Muluk, who was a granddaughter of Fath Ali Shah of Persia. After Eton College, he went on to study at the University of Cambridge.

Career
In 1885, at the age of seven, he succeeded his father as Imam of the Shi'a Isma'ili Muslims.

The Aga Khan travelled in distant parts of the world to receive the homage of his followers, and with the objective either of settling differences or of advancing their welfare by financial help and personal advice and guidance. The distinction of a Knight Commander of the Indian Empire (KCIE) was conferred upon him by Queen Victoria in 1897; and he was promoted to a Knight Grand Commander (GCIE) in the 1902 Coronation Honours list, and invested as such by King Edward VII at Buckingham Palace on 24 October 1902. He was made a Knight Grand Commander of the Order of the Star of India (GCSI) by George V (1912), and appointed a GCMG in 1923. He received like recognition for his public services from the German Emperor, the Sultan of Turkey, the Shah of Persia and other potentates.

In 1906, the Aga Khan was a founding member and first president of the All India Muslim League, a political party which pushed for the creation of an independent Muslim nation in the north west regions of India, then under British colonial rule, and later established the country of Pakistan in 1947.

During the three Round Table Conferences (India) in London from 1930 to 1932, he played an important role to bring about Indian constitutional reforms.

In 1934, he was made a member of the Privy Council and served as a member of the League of Nations (1934–37), becoming the President of the League of Nations in 1937.

Imamat

Under the leadership of Sir Sultan Muhammad Shah, Aga Khan III, the first half of the 20th century was a period of significant development for the Ismā'īlī community. Numerous institutions for social and economic development were established in the Indian Subcontinent and in East Africa. Ismailis have marked the Jubilees of their Imāms with public celebrations, which are symbolic affirmations of the ties that link the Ismāʿīlī Imām and its followers. Although the Jubilees have no religious significance, they serve to reaffirm the Imamat's worldwide commitment to the improvement of the quality of human life, especially in the developing countries.

The Jubilees of Sir Sultan Mahomed Shah, Aga Khan III, are well remembered. During his 72 years of Imamat (1885–1957), the community celebrated his Golden (1937), Diamond (1946) and Platinum (1954) Jubilees. To show their appreciation and affection, the Ismā'īliyya weighed their Imam in gold, diamonds and, symbolically, in platinum, respectively, the proceeds of which were used to further develop major social welfare and development institutions in Asia and Africa.

In India and later in Pakistan, social development institutions were established, in the words of Aga Khan III, "for the relief of humanity". They included institutions such as the Diamond Jubilee Trust and the Platinum Jubilee Investments Limited which in turn assisted the growth of various types of cooperative societies. Diamond Jubilee High School for Girls were established throughout the remote Northern Areas of what is now Pakistan. In addition, scholarship programs, established at the time of the Golden Jubilee to give assistance to needy students, were progressively expanded. In East Africa, major social welfare and economic development institutions were established. Those involved in social welfare included the accelerated development of schools and community centres, and a modern, fully equipped hospital in Nairobi. Among the economic development institutions established in East Africa were companies such as the Diamond Jubilee Investment Trust (now Diamond Trust of Kenya) and the Jubilee Insurance Company, which are quoted on the Nairobi Stock Exchange and have become major players in national development.

Sir Sultan Mahomed Shah also introduced organizational reforms that gave Ismāʿīlī communities the means to structure and regulate their own affairs. These were built on the Muslim tradition of a communitarian ethic on the one hand, and responsible individual conscience with freedom to negotiate one's own moral commitment and destiny on the other. In 1905 he ordained the first Ismā'īlī Constitution for the social governance of the community in East Africa. The new administration for the Community's affairs was organised into a hierarchy of councils at the local, national, and regional levels. The constitution also set out rules in such matters as marriage, divorce and inheritance, guidelines for mutual cooperation and support among Ismā'īlīs, and their interface with other communities. Similar constitutions were promulgated in India, and all were periodically revised to address emerging needs and circumstances in diverse settings.

In 1905, the Aga Khan was involved in the Haji Bibi case, where he was questioned about the origin of his followers. In his response, in addition to enumerating his followers in Iran, Russia, Afghanistan, Central Asia, Syria and other places, he also noted that “In Hindustan and Africa there are many Guptis who believe in me…I consider them Shi’i Imami Ismailis; by caste they are Hindus”.

Following the Second World War, far-reaching social, economic and political changes profoundly affected a number of areas where Ismāʿīlīs resided. In 1947, British rule in the Indian Subcontinent was replaced by the sovereign, independent nations of India, Pakistan and later Bangladesh, resulting in the migration of millions people and significant loss of life and property. In the Middle East, the Suez crisis of 1956 as well as the preceding crisis in Iran, demonstrated the sharp upsurge of nationalism, which was as assertive of the region's social and economic aspirations as of its political independence. Africa was also set on its course to decolonisation, swept by what Harold Macmillan, the then British prime minister, termed the "wind of change". By the early 1960s, most of East and Central Africa, where the majority of the Ismāʿīlī population on the continent resided, including Tanganyika, Kenya, Uganda, Madagascar, Rwanda, Burundi and Zaire, had attained their political independence.

Religious and social views

The Aga Khan was deeply influenced by the views of Sir Sayyid Ahmad Khan. Along with Sir Sayyid, the Aga Khan was one of the backers and founders of the Aligarh University, for which he tirelessly raised funds and to which he donated large sums of his own money. The Aga Khan himself can be considered an Islamic modernist and an intellectual of the Aligarh movement.

From a religious standpoint, the Aga Khan followed a modernist approach to Islam. He believed there to be no contradiction between religion and modernity, and urged Muslims to embrace modernity. Although he opposed a wholesale replication of Western society by Muslims, the Aga Khan did believe increased contact with the West would be overall beneficial to Muslim society. He was intellectually open to Western philosophy and ideas, and believed engagement with them could lead to a revival and renaissance within Islamic thought.

Like many other Islamic modernists, the Aga Khan held a low opinion of the traditional religious establishment (the ʿUlamāʾ) as well as what he saw as their rigid formalism, legalism, and literalism. Instead, he advocated for renewed ijtihād (independent reasoning) and ijmāʿ (consensus), the latter of which he understood in a modernist way to mean consensus-building. According to him, Muslims should go back to the original sources, especially the Qurʾān, in order to discover the true essence and spirit of Islam. Once the principles of the faith were discovered, they would be seen to be universal and modern. Islam, in his view, had an underlying liberal and democratic spirit. He also called for full civil and religious liberties, peace and disarmament, and an end to all wars.

The Aga Khan opposed sectarianism, which he believed to sap the strength and unity of the Muslim community. In specific, he called for a rapprochement between Sunnism and Shīʿism. This did not mean that he thought religious differences would go away, and he himself instructed his Ismāʿīlī followers to be dedicated to their own teachings. However, he believed in unity through accepting diversity, and by respecting differences of opinion. On his view, there was strength to be found in the diversity of Muslim traditions.

The Aga Khan called for social reform in Muslim society, and he was able to implement them within his own Ismāʿīlī community. As he believed Islam to essentially be a humanitarian religion, the Aga Khan called for the reduction and eradication of poverty. Like Sir Sayyid, the Aga Khan was concerned that Muslims had fallen behind the Hindu community in terms of education. According to him, education was the path to progress. He was a tireless advocate for compulsory and universal primary education, and also for the creation of higher institutions of learning.

In terms of women's rights, the Aga Khan was more progressive in his views than Sir Sayyid and many other Islamic modernists of his time. The Aga Khan framed his pursuit of women's rights not simply in the context of women being better mothers or wives, but rather, for women's own benefit. He endorsed the spiritual equality of men and women in Islam, and he also called for full political equality. This included the right to vote and the right to an education. In regards to the latter issue, he endorsed compulsory primary education for girls. He also encouraged women to pursue higher university-level education, and saw nothing wrong with co-educational institutions. Whereas Sir Sayyid prioritized the education of boys over girls, the Aga Khan instructed his followers that if they had a son and daughter, and if they could only afford to send one of them to school, they should send the daughter over the boy.

The Aga Khan campaigned against the institution of purda and zenāna, which he felt were oppressive and un-Islamic institutions. He completely banned the purda and the face veil for his Ismāʿīlī followers. The Aga Khan also restricted polygamy, encouraged marriage to widows, and banned child marriage. He also made marriage and divorce laws more equitable to women. Overall, he encouraged women to take part in all national activities and to agitate for their full religious, social, and political rights.

Today, in large part due to the Aga Khan's reforms, the Ismāʿīlī community is one of the most progressive, peaceful, and prosperous branches of Islam.

Racehorse ownership and equestrianism
He was an owner of Thoroughbred racing horses, including a record equalling five winners of The Derby (Blenheim, Bahram, Mahmoud, My Love, Tulyar) and a total of sixteen winners of British Classic Races. He was British flat racing Champion Owner thirteen times.  According to Ben Pimlott, biographer of Queen Elizabeth II, the Aga Khan presented Her Majesty with a filly called Astrakhan, who won at Hurst Park Racecourse in 1950.

In 1926, the Aga Khan gave a cup (the Aga Khan Trophy) to be awarded to the winners of an international team show jumping competition held at the annual horse show of the Royal Dublin Society in Dublin, Ireland every first week in August. It attracts competitors from all of the main show jumping nations and is carried live on Irish national television.

Marriages and children
 He married, on 2 November 1896, in Pune, India, Shahzadi Begum, his first cousin and a granddaughter of Aga Khan I.
 He married in 1908, Cleope Teresa Magliano (1888–1926). They had two sons: Prince Giuseppe Mahdi Khan (d. February 1911) and Prince Aly Khan (1911–1960). She died in 1926, following an operation on 1 December 1926.
 He married, on 7 December 1929 (civil), in Aix-les-Bains, France, and 13 December 1929 (religious), in Bombay, India, Andrée Joséphine Carron (1898–1976). A co-owner of a dressmaking shop in Paris, she became known as Princess Andrée Aga Khan. By this marriage, he had one son, Prince Sadruddin Aga Khan (1933–2003). The couple were divorced in 1943.
 He married, on 9 October 1944, in Geneva, Switzerland, Begum Om Habibeh Aga Khan (Yvonne Blanche Labrousse) (15 February 19061 July 2000). According to an interview she gave to an Egyptian journalist, her first name was Yvonne, though she is referred to as Yvette in most published references. The daughter of a tram conductor and a dressmaker, she was working as the Aga Khan's social secretary at the time of their marriage. She converted to Islam and became known as Om Habibeh (Little Mother of the Beloved). In 1954, her husband bestowed upon her the title "Mata Salamat".

Publications
He wrote a number of books and papers two of which are of immense importance, namely (1) India in Transition, about the prepartition politics of India and (2) The Memoirs of Aga Khan: World Enough and Time, his autobiography.  The Aga Khan III proposed "the South Asiatic Federation" in India in Transition that India might be re-organized into some states, and those states should have own autonomies.  He was the first person who designed a detailed plan of such a federation of India.

Death and succession
Aga Khan III was succeeded as Aga Khan by his grandson Karim Aga Khan, who is the present Imam of the Ismaili Muslims. At the time of his death on 11 July 1957, his family members were in Versoix. A solicitor brought the will of the Aga Khan III from London to Geneva and read it before the family:

"Ever since the time of my ancestor Ali, the first Imam, that is to say over a period of thirteen hundred years, it has always been the tradition of our family that each Imam chooses his successor at his absolute and unfettered discretion from amongst any of his descendants, whether they be sons or remote male issue and in these circumstances and in view of the fundamentally altered conditions in the world in very recent years due to the great changes which have taken place including the discoveries of atomic science, I am convinced that it is in the best interest of the Shia Muslim Ismailia Community that I should be succeeded by a young man who has been brought up and developed during recent years and in the midst of the new age and who brings a new outlook on life to his office as Imam. For these reasons, I appoint my grandson Karim, the son of my own son, Aly Salomone Khan to succeed to the title of Aga Khan and to the Imam and Pir of all Shia Ismailian followers"

He is buried in the Mausoleum of Aga Khan, on the Nile in Aswan, Egypt (at ).

Legacy
Pakistan Post issued a special 'Birth Centenary of Agha Khan III' postage stamp in his honor in 1977. Pakistan Post again issued a postage stamp in his honor in its 'Pioneers of Freedom' series in 1990.

Honours
21 May 1898 Knight Commander of the Order of the Indian Empire, KCIE
1901 First Class of the Royal Prussian Order of the Crown – in recognition of the valuable services rendered by His Highness to the Imperial German Government in the settlement of various matters with the Mohammedan population of German East Africa
26 June 1902 Knight Grand Commander of the Order of the Indian Empire, GCIE
12 December 1911 Knight Grand Commander of the Order of the Star of India, GCSI
30 May 1923 Knight Grand Cross of the Royal Victorian Order, GCVO – on the occasion of the King's birthday
1 January 1934 Appointed a member of His Majesty's Most Honourable Privy Council by King George V
1 January 1955 Knight Grand Cross of the Order of St Michael and St George, GCMG –

References

Sources
 
 
 Daftary, F., "The Isma'ilis: Their History and Doctrines", Cambridge University Press, 1990.
 Khoja-Moolji, Shenila. “Redefining Muslim women: Aga Khan III’s reforms for women’s education.” South Asia Graduate Research Journal 20, no. 1, 2011, 69-94.
 Khoja-Moolji, Shenila. Forging the Ideal Educated Girl. The Production of Desirable Subjects in Muslim South Asia. Oakland: University of California Press, 2018.
 Naoroji M. Dumasia, A Brief History of the Aga Khan (1903).
 Aga Khan III, "The Memoirs of Aga Khan: World Enough and Time", London: Cassel & Company, 1954; published the same year in the United States by Simon & Schuster.
 Edwards, Anne (1996). "Throne of Gold: The Lives of the Aga Khans", New York: William Morrow, 1996
 Naoroji M. Dumasia, "The Aga Khan and his ancestors", New Delhi: Readworthy Publications (P) Ltd., 2008
Valliani, Amin; "Aga Khan's Role in the Founding and Consolidation of the All India Muslim League", Journal of the Pakistan Historical Society (2007) 55# 1/2, pp 85–95.

External links

 Video Clip from the History Channel website
  Institute of Ismaili Studies: Selected speeches of Sir Sultan Mahomed Shah Aga Khan III 
    The Official Ismaili Website
   Official Website of Aga Khan Development Network
 Aga Khan materials in the South Asian American Digital Archive (SAADA)
 

1877 births
1957 deaths
Qajar dynasty
Aga Khan Development Network
British racehorse owners and breeders
Owners of Epsom Derby winners
Pakistani racehorse owners and breeders
Pakistani philanthropists
Pakistani religious leaders
20th-century Indian philanthropists
Leaders of the Pakistan Movement
Pakistan Movement
Aga Khans
Indian members of the Privy Council of the United Kingdom
Presidents of the Assembly of the League of Nations
People educated at Eton College
Knights Grand Commander of the Order of the Indian Empire
Knights Grand Commander of the Order of the Star of India
Knights Grand Cross of the Order of St Michael and St George
Knights Grand Cross of the Royal Victorian Order
Indian knights
Indian Ismailis
Pakistani Ismailis
Indian imams
Pakistani imams
20th-century imams
Founders of Indian schools and colleges
People from Karachi
Pakistani people of Iranian descent
Owners of Prix de l'Arc de Triomphe winners
Pakistani people of Arab descent
British people of Arab descent
19th-century Ismailis
20th-century Ismailis